The Colorado Flames were a minor-pro hockey team that played in the Central Hockey League (CHL) in Denver, Colorado for two seasons from 1982 to 1984. They were the top minor league affiliate of the NHL's Calgary Flames.  They played their home games at McNichols Arena. When the league folded, the team did too. Goalie Mike Vernon and Al MacInnis played for the team during their time with the Calgary Flames.

Sources
 A page documenting the history of Colorado pro hockey 

Sports teams in Denver
Central Professional Hockey League teams
Ice hockey teams in Colorado
1982 establishments in Colorado
1984 establishments in Colorado
Ice hockey clubs established in 1982
Sports clubs disestablished in 1984
Defunct sports teams in Colorado
Calgary Flames minor league affiliates